The Town Moor is an area of common land in Newcastle upon Tyne. It is also larger than New York City's Central Park (843 acres). The Town Moor reaches Spital Tongues and the city centre to the south, Gosforth to the north and Jesmond to the east (where it meets Exhibition Park).

Freemen of the city have the right to graze cattle on the Town Moor. The rental income is distributed through the Town Moor Money Charity.

The ornithologist and landscape architect John Hancock, after whom the nearby Hancock Museum is named, produced a planned layout for the Town Moor in 1868, which was only partly realised.

In 1873 a political demonstration in favour of full male suffrage took place on the moor which attracted 200,000 people, the largest recorded mass gathering to have taken place there.

The Hoppings, said to be Europe's largest travelling fun fair, is held on the Town Moor during the last week in June.

The area of common land is actually split up into several sections, of which the Town Moor is but the major part. The area is intersected by the A189 road and the section on the other side of the road is known as Nuns Moor, and includes the Newcastle United Golf Club. Also part of Town Moor are Dukes Moor and Little Moor, both at its northern end, Hunters Moor to the west, and Castle Leazes Moor to the south.

The moor has recently had a pathway relaid with more street lighting and CCTV.

The Town Moor is mentioned in the Maxïmo Park song "The Undercurrents".

Sports and horse racing 
Since the 18th century the Town Moor has hosted a significant number of sports and recreational events including rabbit coursing, horse racing and  running. In 1892 the Town Moor hosted a baseball event where Wallsend became the national champions.

The Town Moor first hosted horse racing events in 1721 and competed with races held at Killingworth Moor. The Town Moor's course was approximately two miles long, a triangular shape and located at the northern area of the moor, just south of Gosforth. Part of the course ran through a cutting which can still be seen in the grass at the north of the moor. In 1800 a permanent stone grandstand was built at the north end of the racecourse; a fire damaged it for a short time in 1844. The road in front of this grandstand is still called Grandstand Road to this day. From 1833 the Northumberland Plate horse race was hosted at the Town Moor. The Town Moor attracted the larger events than Killingworth, but by the summer of 1881 the Town Moor hosted its last race and racing moved to Gosforth Park that same year.

A Smallpox Isolation Hospital was built on the western side of Town Moor in 1882, and demolished by 1958. The site is still visible as a fenced linear copse or wooded area near the bottom of Cow Hill, the larger of the two hills on the west perimeter of the moor.

Events on the moor 
A mela (a celebration of Asian cuisine, music and art) is held annually over the August bank holiday weekend.
A parkrun (5 km) takes place at 9 am every Saturday morning, and a junior parkrun (2 k) for 4-14 year kids at 9am every Sunday morning .
The Great North Run starts on the western edge of the Town Moor, and both competitors and spectators gather on the Moor to access the start. The 2021 race, with its route altered to facilitate social distancing during the Covid-19 Pandemic, ended to the east of the Town Moor.

Aerodrome 

Town Moor Aerodrome opened in June 1916. On 8 April 1921 a hangar at the aerodrome was destroyed by arson by an Irish Republican Army team led by Edward Kerrigan, after they overpowered the airfield's night-watchman. Two aircraft were also destroyed.

See also
 The Hoppings

References

Parks and open spaces in Newcastle upon Tyne